Den Max is a children's book series, written by Barbro Lindgren and illustrated by Eva Eriksson.

Books 
Max bil - 1981
Max kaka - 1981
Max nalle - 1981
Max balja - 1982
Max boll - 1982
Max lampa - 1982
Max potta - 1986
Max dockvagn - 1986
Titta Max grav! - 1991
Max blöja - 1994
Max napp - 1994

References

Swedish children's book series
Child characters in literature
Works by Barbro Lindgren
Book series introduced in 1981